J. Ellsworth Kalas (February 14, 1923 – November 12, 2015) was a president and a professor of Asbury Theological Seminary in Wilmore, Kentucky. He also served as pastor for 38 years in the Wisconsin and Ohio Conferences of the United Methodist Church and was associated for 5 years with the World Methodist Council.

Education and career
Kalas obtained his Bachelor of Science at University of Wisconsin–Madison in 1951; his Bachelor of Divinity at Garrett Theological Seminary in 1954; and did additional graduate studies at University of Wisconsin–Madison (1954-1955), and Harvard University (1955-1956). Dr. Kalas also held honorary degrees from Lawrence University, Asbury Theological Seminary, and Kentucky Wesleyan College.

Kalas' tenure with Asbury began in 1993 and he had taught Preaching there since 2000. He was the author of multiple Bible Studies published by the United Methodist Publishing House as well as a groundbreaking study called "Christian Believer" which attempts to teach Methodist laity systematic theology.

His addition to the field of homiletics is the concept of the Biographical Sermon, teaching a doctrine or biblical concept through the story of a real person's life. Biographical preaching can model methods for dealing with suffering and pain by telling the story of an exemplar's struggle with suffering and pain.

Death
Kalas died on November 12, 2015. He was 92, the same age as Asbury Seminary – both born in 1923.

Works
Kalas authored over 35 different books and many additional published articles. As well as 13 adult study quarterlies for the United Methodist Publishing House.

Books

Chapters

References

1923 births
2015 deaths
Seminary presidents
20th-century American theologians
20th-century Methodist ministers
People from Wisconsin
People from Cleveland
Harvard University alumni
University of Wisconsin–Madison alumni
Garrett–Evangelical Theological Seminary alumni
American United Methodist clergy
20th-century American clergy